The 24th Army Tank Brigade was an armoured brigade of the British Army. It was embodied in the United Kingdom at the outbreak of the Second World War. On 1 November 1940, it was redesignated as the 24th Armoured Brigade and reorganized. In July 1942, it transferred to Egypt and took part in the Western Desert Campaign, notably the Second Battle of El Alamein. The Headquarters was disbanded in the Middle East on 1 March 1943.

Original formation
The 24th Army Tank Brigade was a Territorial Army (TA) Tank brigade of the British Army, one of four Army Tank Brigades in the TA in 1939. It was embodied in the United Kingdom on 1 September 1939 at the outbreak of the Second World War, commanding 41st, 45th and 47th Royal Tank Regiments (41st, 45th and 47th RTR) of the TA. It remained in the UK under Northern Command throughout its existence. On 1 November 1940 it was redesignated as the 24th Armoured Brigade and reorganized.

The reorganization saw the addition of a motor battalion – 1st Battalion, Queen's Westminsters – to provide motorized infantry support to the Brigade. On 22 November 1940, the Brigade joined 8th Armoured Division.  With the division, it left the UK on 8 May 1942, arriving in Egypt on 8 July – the long sea journey being due to transiting via the Cape of Good Hope. 8th Armoured Division was destined never to operate as a complete formation; at this time, for tactical reasons, the battle formation in the Middle East became the Brigade Group and the division would now operate as two Brigade Groups. Along with the 23rd Armoured Brigade, the brigade was reorganised on 30 August as the 24th Armoured Brigade Group with three armoured regiments, a motor battalion, an artillery regiment, an anti-tank battery, a light anti-aircraft battery and various other support units.

The brigade's most notable action was in the Battle of El Alamein from 23 October to 4 November 1942. For the battle, the brigade was attached to 10th Armoured Division and equipped with 2 Grants, 93 Shermans and 45 Crusaders for a total of 140 tanks. On the night of 24/25 October, the brigade took part in the unsuccessful thrust by 10th Armoured Division from Miteirya Ridge. The leading unit, 8th Armoured Brigade, was caught on their start line at 22:00 – zero hour – by an air attack and were scattered. 24th Armoured Brigade had pushed forward and reported at dawn they were on the Pierson line, although it turned out that, in the dust and confusion, they had mistaken their position and were well short. On 27 October, the brigade supported the 2nd Battalion, Rifle Brigade's attack on Outpost Snipe.  The brigade was soon in contact with the Rifle Brigade (having shelled them in error for a while). Some hours of confused fighting ensued involving tanks from the Littorio Armoured Division and troops and anti-tank guns from 15th Panzer Division which managed to keep the British armour at bay in spite of the support of the Rifle Brigade battlegroup's anti-tank guns.

After the battle, the brigade's officers and men were progressively posted away to other units over the succeeding months.  In December, 11th Battalion, King's Royal Rifle Corps was posted to 23rd Armoured Brigade, and 41st RTR was replaced by the 2nd Royal Gloucestershire Hussars (2nd RGH), formerly of 22nd Armoured Brigade. The remaining units were placed in suspended animation: 47th RTR in December 1942, 2nd RGH in January 1943, and 45th RTR in March 1943. The Headquarters was disbanded in the Middle East on 1 March 1943.

Commanders
The 24th Army Tank / Armoured Brigade had the following commanders:

Component units
The 24th Army Tank / Armoured Brigade commanded the following units during its existence:

While organized as 24th Armoured Brigade Group, it also commanded:

Dummy tanks

The brigade was reformed to control a number of dummy tank "regiments".  These were intended to deceive the enemy as to the disposition and strength of British armour.

Reformed
On 5 July 1942, 'A' Force Depot was redesignated as 74th Armoured Brigade (Dummy Tanks) in Egypt under the command of Headquarters British Troops in Egypt. The "brigade" was redesignated a number of times: as 24th Armoured Brigade (Dummy Tanks) from 23 August 1943, as 87th Armoured Brigade (Dummy Tanks) from 26 May 1944, and back to 24th Armoured Brigade (Dummy Tanks) again from 14 July 1944.  Finally, on 29 September 1944 it was redesignated and reorganized as 13th Reserve Unit in the UK.

Commander
74th / 24th / 87th Armoured Brigade (Dummy Tanks) was commanded throughout its existence by Lt-Col V.H. Jones (other than a brief period from 30 April to 30 June 1943 when Captain P.K. Copperthwaite was acting commander).

Dummy tank units

The brigade commanded the following units during its existence:

See also

 British armoured formations of World War II
 List of British brigades of the Second World War
 Structure of the British Army in 1939

Notes

References

Bibliography

Further reading

External links
 

24 Armoured
Fictional units of World War II
Military units and formations established in 1939
Military units and formations disestablished in 1943